Raymond W. Field KC*HS (born 24 May 1944), is a retired Catholic Auxiliary Bishop of Dublin, Ireland.

Born in Dublin, County Dublin, he was educated at O'Connell's CBS, and went to Clonliffe College where he ordained a priest on 17 May 1970 for his home diocese.

He also trained as a barrister studying at the King's Inns and was called to the Irish bar he was also called to the English bar. He was also a member of the first successful Irish expedition to Mount Everest in 1993 with Dawson Stelfox.

On 28 May 1997 he was appointed Auxiliary Bishop for the Archdiocese and Titular Bishop of Árd Mór. He was ordained a bishop on 21 September 1997.  The principal consecrator was Cardinal Desmond Connell; his principal co-consecrators were Archbishop Luciano Storero, and Bishop Laurence Forristal.

In November 2009, there were calls for him to resign from his post in the wake of the publication of the Murphy Report. On Christmas Eve 2009 at Midnight Mass, it was announced that Field and fellow bishop Eamonn Walsh had resigned.

In their joint resignation speech they said they had that "evening informed Archbishop Diarmuid Martin that we are offering our resignation to His Holiness, Pope Benedict XVI, as Auxiliary Bishops to the Archbishop of Dublin. As we celebrate the Feast of Christmas, the Birth of our Saviour, the Prince of Peace, it is our hope that our action may help to bring the peace and reconciliation of Jesus Christ to the victims/survivors of child sexual abuse. We again apologise to them. Our thoughts and prayers are with those who have so bravely spoken out and those who continue to suffer in silence."

On 11 August 2010, it was announced that Pope Benedict XVI did not accept Bishop Field's resignation and that he would return to ministry within the archdiocese along with Bishop Eamonn Walsh.

He retired on 28 June 2019.

See also

Murphy Report
Ryan Report

References

External links
Bio at the Catholic Bishops Conference

1944 births
Living people
Alumni of Clonliffe College
Irish barristers
Christian clergy from Dublin (city)
20th-century Roman Catholic bishops in Ireland
21st-century Roman Catholic bishops in Ireland
20th-century Roman Catholic titular bishops
Catholic Church sexual abuse scandals in Ireland
Auxiliary bishops of the Roman Catholic Archdiocese of Dublin
Ecclesiastical passivity to Catholic sexual abuse cases
21st-century Roman Catholic titular bishops